Petteri Kaijasilta (born 3 August 1974) is a retired Finnish football striker.

References

1974 births
Living people
Finnish footballers
Turun Palloseura footballers
Falkirk F.C. players
Vaasan Palloseura players
FC Jokerit players
Atlantis FC players
AC Allianssi players
PK-35 Vantaa (men) players
Myllykosken Pallo −47 players
Association football forwards
Finland international footballers
Finnish expatriate footballers
Expatriate footballers in Scotland
Finnish expatriate sportspeople in Scotland
Footballers from Turku